Crockfords (also known as Crockfords Club or Crockfords Casino) is a casino in London located on Curzon Street. The casino is located near and based on the former gentlemen's club in London called Crockford's.

In September 1999, Kerry Packer reportedly lost £11 million ($16.5 million) at Crockfords overtaking the previous British record loss at the time of £8 million by Greek millionaire Frank Saracakis, which also occurred at Crockfords.

In 2012, poker player Phil Ivey, won £7.7 million after beating the casino in a session of punto banco baccarat, but was refused payment due to allegations of edge sorting. Ivey admitted to edge sorting, considering it a legitimate strategy and later sued the casino, but the court ruled in favor of Crockfords, stating Ivey was "cheating under civil law". Ivey appealed this ruling, but lost his appeal in October 2017 in the UK Supreme Court.

See also
 List of casinos

References

External links

Casinos in England
British culture
Buildings and structures in Mayfair
Grade I listed buildings in the City of Westminster